Hattrick is an Iranian football live television program, broadcast every Saturday night from Iran International. The founder, presenter and producer of the program is Mazdak Mirzaei and program Analyst Mohammad Taghavi and assistant presenter is Zahra Alipour.

Hattrick uses British refereeing experts to examine the refereeing scenes of Iranian football matches.

History 
Hattrick program was founded in 2019 by Mazdak Mirzaei. The first episode of the Hattrick program aired on 7 December 2019.

Attributes

Broadcasting 
Hattrick program airs on Iran International every Saturday at 22:00.

Presenter 
The program is Presented by Mazdak Mirzaei.

Theme

Program process 
Every week the Hattrick program reviews and analyzes events related to Iranian football. The program features scenes from the Persian Gulf Pro League and the Iranian Hazfi Cup and specifically deals with women's football in Iran. Hattrick performs technical analysis and refereeing of football matches each week and makes the viewing of the program attractive to viewers using beautiful graphics.

Program sections 
 What you will see:
The first section of the program, which features Mazdak Mirzaei and Zahra Alipour, explain what viewers will see on the program that night.
 Broadcast summary of matches:
In this section, important match scenes are presented along with a description of the events.  After the summary of each game, the game is technically and statistically reviewed.
 Expert Section:
In the Hattrick program, each week Mohammad Taghavi as a technical expert and British refereeing experts comment on the games.
 Poll:
In each episode a question is posed as a poll or quiz, in which viewers are asked to respond to the poll on the official Instagram page of Iran International Sport (iranintlsport).
 Guest:
In some episodes of the program, coaches, players and artists overseas are invited to the program and discuss with the presenter various soccer issues.
 Items:
Every week in this section, items from Iranian football are broadcast.
 Media review:
In this section, with the present of Zahra Alipour, the Iranian football media is investigated.
 Technical Analysis :
In this section, important or special games are analyzed each week (technically or qualitatively) by a multiplayer team and the results are broadcast with game images and explanations by Mohammad Taghavi.
 Best players of the week:
This section introduces the top 3 players of the week in the Persian Gulf Pro League.
 Check the league table:
This section examines the Persian Gulf Pro League table at the end of the week.
 Review of women's football matches:
This section examines the matches played during the week in Iranian women's football.
 Best women player of the week:
This section introduces the top female player of the week in Iranian football.
 Top images of the week:
This section will be played as end theme of the program with images of the league games.

Seasons information

See also 
 Mazdak Mirzaei
 Iran International

References

External links 
 
 
 Hattrick page on Iran International website

Iranian television shows
Association football television series
2010s Iranian television series
2020s Iranian television series
Persian-language television shows
Criticism of sports